Winifred Dunn was an American screenwriter, editor, radio scenario writer, and art critic in the early 20th century. She was one of the youngest scenario editors of the silent era and was credited with writing over 40 productions.

Early life
Born around 1898, Winifred Dunn spent her childhood on an island at Squirrel Lake, Wisconsin. Coming from a family of writers, Dunn made her decision to be a writer at the age of 6. She moved out to Chicago, Illinois, at a young age, starting a career that would lead her to be one of the youngest scenario editors in the film industry.

Career
At the age of 18, Winifred Dunn wrote her first film, Too Late, which launched her formal writing career with the production company Selig Polyscope. Her talent for writing and formatting entertainment pieces became apparent when Dunn translated a German play into English, as well as formatted the production aspects to fit a natural setting on the American stage.

In 1921, Dunn made the big move out to Hollywood to continue the expansion of her career with Sawyer-Lubin Productions. It was there that her 1922 production of Quincy Adams Sawyer (1922) was edited and titled, and also where she wrote a screen adaptation of Your Friend and Mine (1923) by Willard Mack.

In February 1923, Dunn began a new position with Metro Pictures, later known as Metro Goldwyn-Mayer Studios, with formal tasks of a scenario editor. It wasn't long before Dunn was known as one of the "busiest scenario editors in Hollywood." A 1924 story in The Los Angeles Times quotes Dunn encouraging other writers to read many newspapers in order to "keep a metaphorical finger on the pulse of life everywhere."

With her quickly growing popularity, Dunn was recruited by actress Mary Pickford in 1925 to work collaboratively on future projects. The first collaboration of Dunn and Pickford was the 1926 hit Sparrows. The role played by Pickford was out of the ordinary for her often lighthearted work, and therefore was a significant driver for its success. The film was later criticized for copyright issues by Harry Hyde, who claimed the plot of Sparrows was eerily similar to his film The Cry of the Children, and sued both Dunn and Pickford for $100,000.

This was also the year Dunn's film Twinkletoes was released. Dunn had tough competition for her production of Twinkletoes to be performed by famous actress Colleen Moore. Based on the Thomas Burke book Twinkletoes: A Tale of the Limehouse, Dunn had to dig deep into her creative mind to create a film story that fit Moore, while staying relatively true to the original narrative. Dunn beat out the competition and production began a few weeks later.

Toward the close of 1926, Dunn signed a contract for long-term employment of writing scenarios with First National Pictures. It was here that she wrote the scenario for The Patent Leather Kid. To prepare for this assignment, she sat at a boxing ring every Friday night to gain a feel for what the production should be like. In April 1928, Dunn resigned from First National in order to pursue writing pieces with "more sentiment and less sentimentality."

Dunn remained a freelance writer into the sound era and continued her talents through other mediums as well. Dunn was hired to ghostwrite Osa Johnson's autobiography, I Married Adventure: The Lives and Adventures of Martin and Osa Johnson, which was released in 1940. Dunn applied her own spin to the facts found through extensive interviews and research of the story so readers could easily get "swept away." After its release, the book took off, selling 288,000 copies in the first eight months.

Achievements
Dunn was of the youngest scenario editors in the film industry. In April 1928, Dunn took on the duties of chairman of the Women's Executive Committee of the Southern California Olympic Games. Later that year, Dunn was inducted into the writer's executive committee for the Academy of Motion Picture Arts and Sciences as the only female, and also served as a member of the Executive Board for the Writer's Guild.

Personal life
In December 1928, Winifred Dunn announced her marriage to Harold Swartz, a successful sculptor. The ceremony was held in San Diego, and Dunn's mother was present. Contrary to popular norms of the time, Dunn did not let her marriage stop her career and continued to work as a freelance writer. After Dunn filed for divorce against Swartz in May 1942, records of her life stopped appearing in periodicals for public viewing.

Filmography
Winifred Dunn has been credited as a screenwriter in 41 productions, as editor in three, and both screenwriter and editor in two.

Screenwriter

 Too Late, 1914
 Out of the Depths, 1914
 And the Children Pay, 1918
 Peg o' the Sea, 1918
 Human Passions, 1919
 It Happened In Paris, 1919 
 The Red Viper, 1919
 Thunderbolts of Fate, 1919 
 Your Wife and Mine, 1919 
 Garments of Truth, 1921 
 Silent Years (1921)
 The Glory of Clementina, 1922
 Little Eva Ascends, 1922
 Two Kinds of Women, 1922 
 When Love Comes, 1922 
 Held To Answer, 1923
 In Search of a Thrill, 1923 
 Stormswept (Wreckage), 1923
 The Eagle's Feather, 1923 
 The Fog, 1923
 The Man Life Passed By (1923)
 Your Friend and Mine, 1923 
 Along Came Ruth, 1924
 The Shooting of Dan McGrew, 1924 (with Barbara La Marr)
 Sandra, 1924 (uncredited; with Arthur H. Sawyer and Barbara La Marr)
 Sparrows, 1926
 Twinkletoes, 1926
 Lonesome Ladies, 1927
 The Patent Leather Kid, 1927
 The Drop Kick, 1927
 The Tender Hour, 1927
 Adoration, 1928
 Submarine, 1928
 Mamba, 1930
 Free Love, 1930
 Mother's Millions, 1931
 The Impatient Maiden, 1932
 I Have Lived, 1933
 Rainbow Over Broadway, 1933
 Las fronteras del amor (1934)
 I Give My Love, 1934

Editor
 Quincy Adams Sawyer, 1922
 Man and Woman, 1920
 The Beauty Prize, 1924

Screenwriter and Editor
 Human Passions, 1919
 It Happened In Paris, 1919

References

External links

 
 Women Film Pioneers Project (Columbia University)

1898 births
1977 deaths
People from Chicago
American women screenwriters
American art critics
People from Oneida County, Wisconsin
Women film pioneers
American women non-fiction writers
Screenwriters from Illinois
American women film editors
American film editors
20th-century American women writers
20th-century American screenwriters